José Javier Arqués Ferrer (born 16 May 1960) is a retired Spanish athlete who competed in sprinting events. He represented his country at three consecutive Summer Olympics, starting in 1984, as well as one outdoor and one indoor World Championships. In addition, he won six back-to-back 100 metres national titles from 1984 to 1989.

International competitions

1Did not finish in the semifinals

Personal bests
Outdoor
100 metres – 10.21 (+1.8 m/s, Madrid 1986)
200 metres – 21.01 (-0.9 m/s, Manresa 1985)
Indoor
60 metres – 6.60 (Madrid 1986)

Notes

References

All-Athletics profile

External links
 
 
 
 

1960 births
Living people
People from Alcoià
Sportspeople from the Province of Alicante
Spanish male sprinters
Olympic athletes of Spain
Athletes (track and field) at the 1984 Summer Olympics
Athletes (track and field) at the 1988 Summer Olympics
Athletes (track and field) at the 1992 Summer Olympics
World Athletics Championships athletes for Spain
Athletes (track and field) at the 1979 Mediterranean Games
Mediterranean Games competitors for Spain
20th-century Spanish people